is a passenger railway station located in the Kurokawa neighborhood of  Asao-ku, Kawasaki, Kanagawa, Japan and operated by the private railway operator Odakyu Electric Railway.

Lines
Kurokawa Station is served by the Odakyu Tama Line, and is 4.1 kilometers from the terminus of the line at ..

Station layout
The station consists of two opposed side platforms serving two tracks, with an elevated station building over the platforms and tracks.

Platforms

History
Kurokawa Station was opened on June 1, 1974. In 2004 the station became a stop for Section Semi-Express trains. The station building was remodeled in 2006.

Passenger statistics
In fiscal 2019, the station was used by an average of 8,731 passengers daily.

The passenger figures for previous years are as shown below.

See also
 List of railway stations in Japan

References

External links

  

Railway stations in Kanagawa Prefecture
Railway stations in Japan opened in 1974
Stations of Odakyu Electric Railway
Railway stations in Kawasaki, Kanagawa